Bright railway station is the closed terminus station of the Bright line which served the town of Bright in Victoria (Australia). It opened on 17 October 1890 and closed on 30 November 1983.

The former terminus retains a large brick station building and a goods shed. The station platform is still intact with a number of items of Victorian Railways rolling stock sitting on a short section of track fenced in with the station. The station building and grounds are maintained as a local museum. It is now part of the Murray to the Mountains Rail Trail.

References

External links

Disused railway stations in Victoria (Australia)
Railway stations in Australia opened in 1890
Railway stations closed in 1983